Mamachya Gavala Jaaoo Yaa (Marathi: मामाच्या गावाला जाऊ या, English: Let's Go To Uncle's Village) is a Marathi thriller adventurous film directed by Sameer Hemant Joshi starring Abhijeet Khandkekar and Mrunmayee Deshpande in lead roles.

Plot
The story of the film is about the uncle(Mama) we all look up to. He is a friend, a partner in crime, and someone your mother adores, a guy who you look up to, but who lives far away! But distance often bringhearts closer, and that's why one of the most adorable of the relationships keeps growing stronger with our Mama!
Mamachya Gavala Jaaoo Yaa is about this quintessential Mama and his world-apart nephews and niece on an adventurous journey!

Cast
 Abhijeet Khandkekar as Nandu Devkar
 Mrunmayee Deshpande
 Saahil Malge
 Shubhankar Atre
 Arya Bhargude
 Devendra Gaikwad
 Ninad Mahajani
 Saniya Godbole
 Shaunak Joshi

Soundtrack
Music of the film was scored by Prashant Pillai, while the lyrics were penned by Sandip Khare and Avdhoot Gupte.

Release
The film released all over the Maharashtra on 21 November 2014.

References

External links
 

2014 films
2010s Marathi-language films